Gerald Johnson (born June 8, 1950) is an American politician. He served as a Democratic member for the 66-1 and 70th district of the Georgia House of Representatives.

Life and career 
Johnson was born in Cobb County, Georgia. He attended Kennesaw State University.

In 1977, Johnson was elected to represent the  66-1 district of the Georgia House of Representatives, serving until 1983. In the same year, he was elected to represent the 70th district, succeeding Claude A. Bray Jr. He served until 1985, when he was succeeded by Carolyn W. Lee.

References 

1950 births
Living people
People from Cobb County, Georgia
Democratic Party members of the Georgia House of Representatives
20th-century American politicians
Kennesaw State University alumni